"By Your Side" may refer to:

Albums
 By Your Side (The Black Crowes album), 1999, and the title song
 By Your Side (Breakbot album), 2012
 By Your Side (Hillsong album), 1999, and the title song

Songs
 "By Your Side" (Calvin Harris song), 2021
 "By Your Side" (James Cottriall song), 2011 
 "By Your Side" (Jimmy Somerville song), 1995
 "By Your Side" (Rod Wave song), 2021
 "By Your Side" (Sade song), 2000
 "By Your Side" (Squeeze song), 1985
 "By Your Side" (Tenth Avenue North song), 2008
 "By Your Side" (Tokio Hotel song), 2007
 "By Your Side" (Jonas Blue song), 2016
 "By Your Side", a 2004 song by Jadakiss from Kiss of Death
 "By Your Side", a 2007 song by Sebastian Bach from Angel Down
 "By Your Side", a 2008 song by House of Heroes from the album The End Is Not the End
 "By Your Side", a 2005 single by the Thrillseekers
 "By Your Side", a 2010 song by Lifehouse from the album Smoke & Mirrors